Allura Zamarripa and Maribella Zamarripa were the defending champions but chose not to participate.

Giuliana Olmos and Marcela Zacarías won the title, defeating Misaki Doi and Katarzyna Kawa in the final, 7–5, 1–6, [10–5].

Seeds

Draw

Draw

References
Main Draw

Christus Health Pro Challenge - Doubles